Sant'Orsola Terme (Mòcheno: Oachpergh) is a comune (municipality) in Trentino in the northern Italian region Trentino-Alto Adige/Südtirol, located about  northeast of Trento.

Sant'Orsola Terme borders the following municipalities: Bedollo, Baselga di Pinè, Palù del Fersina, Fierozzo, Frassilongo and Pergine Valsugana.

Demographic evolution

References

Cities and towns in Trentino-Alto Adige/Südtirol